Emma Clare Wiggs,  (born 14 June 1980) is a British paracanoeist and former
sitting volleyball player, who competes in the KL2 classification of paracanoe. She won gold at the 2016 Summer Paralympics in the KL2 category, gold and silver at the 2020 Summer Paralympics in VL2 and KL2 categories, and is also a nine-time world champion. As a volleyball player she was part of the Great Britain team that competed at the 2012 Summer Paralympics.

Background
Wiggs was born in Harrow, London and grew up in Watford. She attended Watford Grammar School for Girls. At the age of 18 she contracted an unidentified virus during a gap year in Australia which caused paralysis in her arms and legs. Her arms later recovered, but she had permanent nerve damage in her legs.

Wiggs graduated from the University of Chichester with a degree in sports and exercise sciences in 2003, and went on to qualify as a teacher by gaining the Postgraduate Certificate in Education in 2004. She worked as a physical education teacher at Lavant House (the school is now closed) in Chichester and The Regis School in Bognor Regis before becoming a full-time athlete.

Career
Wiggs took up sitting volleyball in 2010 after attending a UK Sport talent identification day, where she was offered the opportunity to train in five different sports but chose sitting volleyball because she wanted to compete in a team sport. She captained the Great Britain team which won the bronze medal at the 2010 World Championships, and was a member of the team that competed at the 2012 Summer Paralympics, finishing eighth. At club level she played for Portsmouth Sharks.

Wiggs switched to paracanoeing after the 2012 Paralympics. She became a full-time athlete, training at the Holme Pierrepont National Watersports Centre in Nottingham, and won European and World Championship titles in the K1 200m TA class in 2013. In 2014, she successfully defended both titles, and also won gold at the World Championships and silver at the European Championships in the V1W 200m TA class. She won further world titles in the K1 200m KL2 class in 2015 and 2016, and also won the silver medal at the 2015 European Championships.

Wiggs won gold in the KL2 class at the 2016 Summer Paralympics, the first Paralympics to feature canoeing events, with a time of 53.288 seconds.

At the 2020 Paralympics she became the most successful Female Paracanoest, winning a further Gold in the VL2 and Silver in the KL2. She then continued her success with Gold and Silver at the Paracanoe Worlds in the VL2 and KL2.

Career outside Sport
Wiggs is a motivational speaker, ambassador and mentor. She has been chosen as one of 35 elite female athletes for the ‘Unlocked’ initiative, set up by Women’s Sports Trust, with the aim of challenging the lack of diversity in sport, particularly at a senior level; she is a performance champion at Vitality, and she is also working in partnership with Caravan and Motorhome Club supporting disabled access.

Notes

References

External links 

 
 

1980 births
Living people
British women's volleyball players
British sitting volleyball players
Women's sitting volleyball players
British female canoeists
Paracanoeists of Great Britain
Paralympic volleyball players of Great Britain
Paralympic medalists in paracanoe
Paralympic gold medalists for Great Britain
Paralympic silver medalists for Great Britain
Volleyball players at the 2012 Summer Paralympics
Paracanoeists at the 2016 Summer Paralympics
Paracanoeists at the 2020 Summer Paralympics
Medalists at the 2016 Summer Paralympics
Medalists at the 2020 Summer Paralympics
People educated at Watford Grammar School for Girls
Members of the Order of the British Empire
ICF Canoe Sprint World Championships medalists in paracanoe